Jordan Missig (born 22 March 1998) is an American racing driver currently competing in the 2023 USF Pro 2000 Championship with Pabst Racing.

Career

Karting 
Jordan Missig competed in the Briggs & Stratton LO206 powered Margay Ignite Series. He achieved four Ignite Senior Championships at Kart Circuit Autobahn along with a regional Ignite Challenge Series championship in 2018.

Sports cars 
Missig started his sports car racing career at Autobahn Country Club in 2017, competing in both the Spec Miata and Radical Sports Car classes. Missig was able to achieve multiple club wins and championships in his early years before moving into the Radical Cup North America in 2018. In 2019 he finished second in the Radical Cup North America with seven wins.

In 2021 Jordan Missig made his sports car return with Wayne Taylor Racing by competing in the Lamborghini Super Trofeo North America. He finished fourth in the Pro-Am-class standings after taking two class-wins.

Formula Regional Americas 
In 2020 Missig made his debut in single-seater racing by competing in the Formula Regional Americas Championship with Newman Wachs Racing. His best race result of the season was a third place finish at Virginia International Raceway. He finished the season in tenth.

In 2021 he continued to compete in the series with Newman Wachs Racing. He took his maiden race win in the series at Virginia International Raceway and finished the season in fifth.

Indy Pro 2000 Championship 
In 2021 Missig joined Pabst Racing to compete in the season of the Indy Pro 2000 Championship at Mid-Ohio Sports Car Course. He finished his debut race in tenth.

In 2022 he stayed with Pabst Racing to compete in the full Indy Pro 2000 Championship. He finished the season in eleventh.

In 2023 he will once again compete for Pabst Racing in the renamed USF Pro 2000 Championship.

Racing record

Career Summary

References

External links 

 Jordan Missig Racing
 

1998 births
Living people
American racing drivers
Racing drivers from Illinois
Sportspeople from Joliet, Illinois
Formula Regional Americas Championship drivers
Indy Pro 2000 Championship drivers
Wayne Taylor Racing drivers
Lamborghini Super Trofeo drivers